Mpika District is a district of Zambia, located in Muchinga Province. The capital lies at Mpika. As of the 2000 Zambian Census, the district had a population of 146,196 people. With the Luangwa River forming its eastern border, it has most of the South Luangwa National Park within its boundaries. It also contains the North Luangwa National Park.

References

Districts of Muchinga Province